The current law in Ireland requires the potential donor to opt in to becoming an organ donor. However, it is ultimately up to their family to make the decision whether or not the person is allowed to donate their organs after they die.

Organ donation 
Donors in Ireland can be living or dead. Usually living donations consist of giving a kidney to a loved one. 
After someone has died, a person's organs can be donated after brainstem death or circulatory death. Brain stem death is when there is no brain function, with no blood flow or oxygen to the brain. Circulatory death is when the person is injured beyond recovery and will not survive without the support of a ventilator. Two doctors need to verify death via a series of strict tests

There are Specialist Organ Donation Personnel working in hospitals throughout Ireland who provide training, education, support and advice.

Organ Donor Card
The Irish Kidney Association is known for its Organ Donor Card. It has no legal basis, but can be used to communicate a patient's wishes to their next-of-kin.

Current law 
Currently, a person must "opt-in" to organ donation. Having a medical condition does not necessarily prevent a person from becoming a donor – it is ultimately up to an organ retrieval specialist to assess organ suitability for transplantation.

In Ireland, the heart, lungs, liver, pancreas and kidneys can be donated.

New proposed legislation 
There is a new bill being proposed, which arose 12 years ago from the Madden report, which includes an "opt-out" approach to organ donation. This approach assumes consent and allows major organs to be donated without explicit consent once a person has died. A person could "opt-out" of this if they do not wish to donate their organs. However, the person's family will still have the final say and if they request that the individual's organs not be donated, then their wishes will be obeyed.

The Minister for Health, Simon Harris, has said "that the proposed opt-out system would encourage people to discuss their intentions regarding organ donation with their next-of-kin."

The "opt-out" approach is currently used in many other countries including Spain and Belgium. In Spain, the system has proved very effective; the organ donation rates are around 35 per million people in 2012, compared to 17 in the UK.

Statistics 
The number of people who become organ donors in Ireland is variable. A 2015 survey revealed that over 80% of Irish people agree with organ donation.

Whole body donation 
A person can also donate their whole body to any of five medical schools in Ireland for research purposes. Each university has its own regulations:

 Trinity College Dublin
 University College Dublin
 The Royal College of Surgeons in Ireland, Dublin
 University College Cork
 National University of Ireland, Galway

References 

Ireland
Healthcare in Ireland